Upwey is a suburb of Weymouth in south Dorset, England.  The suburb is situated on the B3159 road in the Wey valley. The area was formerly a village until it was absorbed into the Weymouth built-up area. It is located four miles north of the town centre in the outer suburbs.  During the Census 2001 the combined population of Upwey and neighbouring Broadwey was 4,349.

The village has a 13th-century parish church, dedicated to Saint Laurence, and a manor house, Upwey Manor, which was owned by the Gould family. A disc barrow is located above the village on the Ridgeway at map reference . The former United Reformed Church was built in 1880–81 and closed in 1992.

The River Wey rises at the foot of the chalk ridge of the South Dorset Downs, which rise above Upwey to the north, and flows through the village.  The source is known as the Upwey wishing well and was a tourist attraction as far back as the Victorian era.  There is now a tea room at the site, complete with mature water gardens. In the 18th century a water mill was built on the river, rebuilt in 1802; it featured in Thomas Hardy's The Trumpet Major; he also wrote a poem "At the Railway Station, Upway", which most likely relates to Upwey station. Another famous name associated with Upwey is that of Lucille Ball the American actress, comedian who was proud of her family and heritage. Her genealogy can be traced back to the earliest settlers in the colonies. One direct ancestor, William Sprague (1609–1675), left England on the ship Lyon's Whelp for Plymouth/Salem, Massachusetts. They were from Upwey, Dorset, England. Along with his two brothers, William helped to found the city of Charlestown, Massachusetts. Other Sprague relatives became soldiers in the US Revolutionary War and two of them became governors of the state of Rhode Island.

Upwey features in Edward Chaney's Genius Friend: G.B. Edwards and The Book of Ebenezer le Page as the place in which Chaney got to know Gerald Edwards and encouraged him to complete his novel. Edwards died in the since-demolished 654 Dorchester Road, Upwey, on 29 December 1976.

Upwey lends its name to Upwey, Victoria, in Melbourne, near Belgrave, Victoria.

References

 Census data

External links

 The Upwey website
 Upwey Local History
 The Dorset Page
 The Dorset Online Parish Clerk
 Upwey Stanton Genealogy

Villages in Dorset
Geography of Weymouth, Dorset